Vicinal may refer to:

 Vicinal (chemistry), stands for any two functional groups bonded to two adjacent atoms.
 Vicinal (logology), a word where all letters have alphabetic neighbors.
 Vicinal tramway or Buurtspoor, a system of narrow gauge tramways or local railways in Belgium.
 In materials science, a "vicinal substrate" is a thin-film substrate whose surface normal deviates slightly from a major crystallographic axis.